The ZSO 523 was a proposed 1940s large military transport designed by the Zeppelin company of Friedrichshafen. During the Second World War Nazi Germany concentrated on building fighters and bombers and the production of support aircraft was transferred to occupied France. The project was abandoned when France was liberated in 1944.

Development
With Messerschmitt concentrating on the design and build of combat aircraft the design of a larger transport/airliner based on the design of the large Messerschmitt Me 323 military transport was sub-contracted to Zeppelin. The aircraft was to be built in France by SNCASO.

The ZSO 523 would be like the Me 323 a high-wing monoplane but was larger with both a front and rear loading ramp. Powered by six 1618 kW (2200 hp) Gnome-Rhône 18R engines it also had a six-wheel retractable main landing gear. Calculations show that with a load of 22 tons the ZSO.523 can reach a distance of 2,200 km, while the maximum load was 46 tonnes.

Specifications (proposed)

See also

References
Notes

1940s German military utility aircraft
Abandoned military aircraft projects of Germany